The Catholic Party was founded in Liverpool in 1925 by the local members of the Irish Nationalist Party following the establishment of the Irish Free State and its separation from the United Kingdom.

The Catholic Party stood candidates in Liverpool City Council elections from 1925 to 1929 when the party was renamed the Centre Party.

See also
 Liverpool City Council
 Liverpool City Council elections 1880–present

References

Political parties established in 1925
Defunct political parties in England
Political history of England
1925 establishments in England